Davenport is a district of Stockport, Greater Manchester, England; until 1974, it was part of Cheshire. At the 2011 census, it had a population of 14,924.

History 
Davenport's name arose from the  building of Davenport railway station at the behest of the Davenport family, who since the later 14th century had owned Bramall Hall in the neighbouring village of Bramhall. The family name came from an ancestral estate between Holmes Chapel and Congleton, in Mid Cheshire. The estate is recorded in the Domesday Book of 1086, where it is listed as Deneport.

Originally, Davenport's expansion in the 1850s consisted of three key routes, Bramhall Lane, Kennerley Road and Buxton Road, all of which remain in place today.

The 1900s saw an increase in construction of residential houses and commercial developments. The aftermath of World War II saw the demolition of larger, older properties in extensive gardens to make way for smaller private residences and flats.

Transport

The railway station, at Davenport's main road junction, allows travel by rail towards  Manchester Piccadilly, Stockport, Hazel Grove and Buxton. Services are generally half-hourly, but hourly on Sundays.

Local bus services are operated by Stagecoach. Routes include the regular 192 service along Buxton Road between Manchester and Hazel Grove.

Places of interest 

Cale Green Park is a popular local attraction with its bowling green, tennis court, basketball court and playground.

Stockport Lacrosse Club, the oldest in the world, have played at Cale Green Cricket Club since 1876.

Education 

Adswood Primary School and St Ambrose Catholic Primary School are the nearest primary schools.

Stockport Grammar School, founded in 1485, lies next to Davenport Park on Buxton Road, whilst immediately across the road is the local authority comprehensive, Stockport School.

References

Areas of Stockport